Gohord (also known as Gohort and Kahrū) is a village in Balvard Rural District, in the Central District of Sirjan County, Kerman Province, Iran. At the 2006 census, its population was 63, in 18 families.

References 

Populated places in Sirjan County